The Roman Catholic Diocese of Kansas City may refer to one of two dioceses in the United States:
Roman Catholic Diocese of Kansas City–Saint Joseph (Missouri); or
Roman Catholic Archdiocese of Kansas City in Kansas